A settlement hierarchy is a way of arranging settlements into a hierarchy based upon their population or some other criteria. The term is used by landscape historians and in the National Curriculum for England. The term is also used in the planning system for the UK and for some other countries such as Ireland, India, and Switzerland. The term was used without comment by the geographer Brian Roberts in 1972.

Overview
In Europe, centuries-old settlements were surrounded by farmland and tended not to be wider than 30 minutes' walk from one end to the other, with wealthier people monopolizing the "town center", and poorer people living on the town's outskirts or nearby countryside (the "sphere of influence"). With the advent of decentralization technologies (e.g., bicycles, trains, cars, etc.), American settlements reversed this trend before reaching their saturation point, with vast farmlands managed by homesteads located dozens of miles away from the nearest settlement; lower-income communities occupied the "center" as the middle-income and upper-income migrated into suburbia. This created a phenomenon known as urban decay.

A settlement's population size, its geographic area, its status, and the availability of services can all affect this hierarchy. Position in a settlement hierarchy can also depend on the sphere of influence. This is how far people will travel to use the services in the settlement: if people travel further the town becomes more important and ranks higher in the settlement hierarchy.

Problems with concept of a settlement hierarchy 
Using the title of a settlement can be misleading in the absence of any widely accepted definition. For example, city status in the United Kingdom historically arose from its place in the ecclesiastic hierarchy. (In modern times, city status is  awarded for secular reasons but without reference to size.) Thus, some cathedral cities in England (e.g., Ely, Cambridgeshire) have a much smaller populations than some towns (e.g., Luton). In the United States, the distinction between town and city is a matter of a decision by local government to incorporate.  In addition, there is no agreement as to the number of levels in the hierarchy or what they should be called. Many terms used to describe settlements (e.g., village) have no legal definition, or may have contradictory legal definitions in different jurisdictions.

Hierarchy and status 
Position in an accepted settlement hierarchy can imply status, which in turn reinforces the position of the settlement in the hierarchy. Status can derive from being the residence of a King or high-ranking member of the nobility or from being the location of a major religious establishment. A formal hierarchy of settlements, known as a multiple estate, appears to have been common in 10th-century England. The centre of an estate (often called a "caput") could be supported by subsidiary settlements, which were sometimes given specialised roles. For example, a Saxon royal estate might be supported by settlements specialising in the production of cheese or barley or maintaining flocks of sheep.

Example of a settlement hierarchy 
In this example, a roadhouse is at the lowest level while the ecumenopolis is at the top with the greatest number of residents:

This is only an example, and in other contexts, the population criteria for each category of settlement might be different.

Note: This settlement hierarchy is adapted from the work of Konstantinos Apostolos Doxiadis for the actual current world situation as of 2010 as opposed to Doxiadis' idealized settlement hierarchy for the year 2100 that he outlined in his 1968 book Ekistics.

Extreme density 

More than one billion residents.

 Ecumenopolis – a theoretical construction in which the entire surface area of Earth is taken up by human settlements, or at least, that those are linked so that to create urban areas so big that they can shape an urban continuum through thousands of kilometers which cannot be considered as a gigalopolis. 

, the World Bank estimates that 56% of the world's population lives in cities, so if these were linked, the total population of this area would be about 4.4 billion people.
 Eperopolis – incorporated gigacities in excess of one billion population, in which the entire continental region is an unbroken continuum of human settlements.

High density 

More than one million residents. At this density, the settlement's population, spheres of influence, and GDP tends to exceed that of most countries with lesser density. The need for administrative divisions, public transportation, public infrastructure and other government public services is critically essential for the sustainable growth and continued prosperity of its citizens. High income jobs and non-essential luxury services are abundant (e.g. car dealerships, brain surgery centers, airports, financing, computer stores, coffee shops, etc.) as these cannot be sustained by lesser density. Medium income exceeds national average. The first city in recorded history to reach a population of one million residents was Ancient Rome in 133 B.C. During the Second Industrial Revolution, London, England reached the mark in 1810 and New York City, United States made it in 1875.

 Gigalopolis or Gigacity – an incorporation of a group of megalopolises, containing over one hundred million residents.
 Megalopolis or Megacity – a supercity consists of a group of conurbations, containing more than ten million residents in total.
 Conurbation or Global city – an extremely large city consists of a group of metropolises, containing between three and ten million residents.
 Metropolis or Municipality – a very large city with its suburbs consisting of multiple satellite cities and towns. The population is usually between one and three million people.

Medium density 

Less than one million residents. At this density, viable access to more specialize advanced services (e.g. doctors, mechanics, colleges, etc.) due to economies of scale being abundant. Average medium income is on par with national average.

 Regiopolis or City – a large city with a large population and many services. The population is less than one million but over 300,000 people.
 Prefecture or County a medium city which has abundant services, but not as many as a large city. The population is between 100,000 and 300,000 people.
 Borough or District – a small city that functions as a type of municipality or subdivision of a consolidated city. The population is usually similar to a large town.

Low density 

Less than one hundred thousand residents. Common "city features" and services such as clinics, pharmacy, bank, supermarket, police station, fire station, schools, residential neighborhoods, restaurant, etc. become more prominent. Density is sufficient to support local commercial areas which may include a "Main Street" or a shopping mall. Average medium income below national average.

 Town or Shire a large town which has a population between 10,000 and 100,000.
 Township or Subdistrict – a medium town which has a population between 1,000 and 10,000.
 Suburb or Locality a small mixed-use town or residential area, existing either as a part of a city or urban area or as a separate residential community within commuting distance of a city.

Minuscule density 

Less than one thousand residents. At this number, settlements are too small or scattered to be considered "urban", and services within these settlements (if any) are generally limited to bare essentials: e.g., church, grocery store, post office, etc. Throughout most of human history, very few settlements could support a population greater than 150 people.

 Village or Tribe a village is a human settlement or community that is larger than a hamlet but smaller than a town. The population of a village varies; the average population can range in the hundreds. Anthropologists regard the number of about 150 members for tribes as the maximum for a functioning human group.
 Hamlet or Band a hamlet has a tiny population (fewer than 100), with only a few buildings. A social band are the simplest level of foraging societies with generally a maximum size of 30 to 50 people; consisting of a small kin group, no larger than an extended family or clan.
 Homestead or Neighbourhood a homestead usually consists of a cluster of isolated dwellings normally occupied by a single extended family, normally would only have one to five buildings or elementary families.
 Roadhouse or Bed and breakfast a roadhouse is a small mixed-use premises typically built on or near a major road in a sparsely populated area or an isolated desert region that services the passing travellers, providing food, drinks, accommodation, fuel, and parking spaces to the guests and their vehicles. The premises generally consists of just a single dwelling, permanently occupied by a nuclear family, usually between two and five family members. A roadhouse is often considered to be the smallest type of human settlement.

Settlement hierarchy by country

Settlement hierarchy in the English planning system
The position of a settlement in the hierarchy is intended to inform decisions about new developments, such as housing. Rather than define the hierarchy by population, an alternative way to construct the hierarchy is based on the services that are available within each settlement. Settlements are described as "level 1", "level 2", etc. rather than using terms such as village or town. The Government planning statement (PPS3) does not specifically mention "settlement hierarchies", but talks about the availability of services to small rural settlements. The term is used a number of times in the guidance for preparing evidence for planning decisions; a settlement hierarchy starts with an isolated dwelling, then hamlet, then village, town, city then a conurbation.

Settlement hierarchy in the German planning system
The German planning system is based on the Central Place Theory developed by Walter Christaller in the 1930s and first applied in the Nazi Era, especially in Poland. Every settlement is categorized by function: highly central cities  (e.g. Hamburg, with speciality clinics for tropical diseases), middle central cities  (for periodic functions e.g. Homburg (Saar) with major schools (starting at 5th grade)) and basic central towns /Unterzentrum (e.g. Illingen with basic doctors and Supermarket). The number of inhabitants is less important: thus a city such as Kaiserslautern (100,000 people) can be a highly specialized city, because it is a centre for the surrounding rural area.
 
It is used at the federal level for the regional planning system of states and planning regions for the "State Development Programmes" (Landesentwicklungsprogramm [de]) and the "Regional Spatial Structure Plans" (Regionaler Raumordnungsplan [de]). These are political plans to achieve goals such as equivalent living standards (Gleichwertige Lebensverhältnisse [de]) in rural and urban areas in all of Germany, east and west.

See also 
 Konstantinos Apostolos Doxiadis
 Ekistics
Green transport hierarchy
Street hierarchy

References

External links
Why Cities Are Where They Are?

Town and country planning in the United Kingdom
Hierarchy